Ram Pande (September 1945 – 17 September 2019) was an Indian historian and civil servant.

Biography
Pande was born at Bhusawar in Rajasthan's Bharatpur district in September 1945. He did his master's degree from the University of Cambridge in the UK and his Ph.D. from the University of Rajasthan in India. The doctoral supervisor for his Ph.D. was Arthur Llewellyn Basham, and the subject of his doctoral thesis was "A Social and Political History of the State of Bharatpur upto 1826". He pursued his D.Litt with "The History of Mauritius" as the subject of research. He spoke multiple languages including French, Marathi, Persian, and Rajasthani languages. Between 1967 to 1974, Pande taught at the Meerut University in Uttar Pradesh and at several colleges in Rajasthan. From 1975 to 1997, he had worked as a "senior civil servant" for the government of Rajasthan. He had served as the "senior research officer" at the Rajasthani government's Department of Labour. Pande died on 17 September 2019 at the age of nearly 74 years.

Research
Pande was a member of the Indian History Congress Association, the Indian History Commission, and the Indian Planning Commission's Technical Advisory Committee.

Pande was of the view that Mewar State's Bijolia movement of 1897 was Rajasthan's first agrarian movement. He shed light on Rajasthan Seva Sangh's role in mobilizing the peasants against the oppression of landlords in the Bijolia movement. He provided a study of the origin of the peasants' struggle against the authorities and landlords. He identified the "excessive taxation", "maladministration", "rapacity of the officials", and the "atrocities committed by the Jagirdars" on the peasants in Alwar, Bikaner, Marwar, and Shekhawati as the root causes for the "agrarian unrest" in those areas of Rajasthan. He inquired into the Bhils' struggle against the British government and Udaipur State's Maharana, the roots of which he traced back to 1823, and pointed out the "census work" which was done in 1881 as one of the reasons for the "dissatisfaction among the Bhils". According to Pande, the Rajasthan Seva Sangh and the Vanvasi Seva Sangh supplemented their struggle from 1920 to 1946.

Hastinapur College's Jagdish C. Joshi noted that Pande described the Champaran Satyagraha as a successor movement to the Bijolia movement; stated that the leaders of the peasant uprisings were not peasants themselves but "external" people with "political motives"; and stressed that the movements' goal was not fighting and overthrowing the feudal system but to "get redress of some of their grievances". According to Joshi, Pande did not provide evidence that Mahatma Gandhi "took cue from it [Bijolia movement]" and did not point out "to what extent leadership was able to impart to the [peasant] movements a political ideology". According to Horatio Freeman and Allen Isaacmen, Pande showed that in the satyagraha, Gandhi used the same "tactics" which the peasants used in Rajasthan's agrarian movements which predated his satyagraha. Freeman and Isaacmen noted that he depicted Rajasthan's peasant movement as "conservative in its goals, operating within the framework of a peasant moral economy based upon a feudal system of land tenure". Joshi concurred with Pande's analysis that majority of the peasants were not part of the movements but noticed that he did not sift through the reasons for the absence of other peasants in the movements. Joshi considered Pande's analysis that "in India, specially in Rajasthan, [peasants] have a faith in democratic socialism which is quite different from Russia or Chinese socialism"; that "India is a traditionally democratic country"; and that "the Rajasthan peasant was not a serf of European type" as assertions.

Works
In total, Pande authored 11 books, 107 research articles, and edited over 30 books.

Books

Books edited

Selected papers

References

1945 births
Alumni of the University of Cambridge
University of Rajasthan alumni
Academic staff of Chaudhary Charan Singh University
21st-century Indian historians
Indian civil servants
2019 deaths